Sérgio Ribeiro is a Brazilian former professional tennis player.

Ribeiro, a native of Paraná, is the son of Brazilian Davis Cup player Ivo. 

Ranked as high as 338 in the world, Ribeiro had a win over Roberto Argüello to make the second round at St Vincent in 1987, then took a set off the top-seeded Kent Carlsson in a second round loss.

References

External links
 
 

Year of birth missing (living people)
Living people
Brazilian male tennis players
Sportspeople from Paraná (state)